Rundberg is a surname. Notable people with the surname include:

Claës Rundberg (1874–1958), Swedish sport shooter 
Karl L. Rundberg (1899–1969), American businessman and politician